Thomas Hurndall (27 November 1981 – 13 January 2004) was a British photography student, a volunteer for the International Solidarity Movement (ISM), and an activist against the Israeli occupation of the Palestinian territories. On 11 April 2003, he was shot in the head in the Gaza Strip by an Israel Defense Forces (IDF) sniper, Taysir Hayb. Hurndall was left in a coma and died nine months later.

Hayb was convicted of manslaughter and obstruction of justice by an Israeli military court in April 2005 and sentenced to eight years in prison. On 10 April 2006, a British inquest jury returned a verdict of unlawful killing.

Tom's mother Jocelyn Hurndall has written a biography of him called Defy the Stars: The Life and Tragic Death of Tom Hurndall, published in April 2007 and reprinted in May 2008 with the alternative title My Son Tom: The Life and Tragic Death of Tom Hurndall. His sister, Sophie, works for Medical Aid for Palestinians.

Student turns activist
Hurndall was educated at Winchester College, a boarding independent school in the cathedral city of Winchester in Hampshire.

Aged 21, Tom Hurndall took a working break from his degree course at Manchester Metropolitan University in photographic journalism to join the "human shields" in Iraq before the 2003 Iraq War. As the volunteers ran out of money and war became inevitable, he moved to Jordan and donated £500 to medical supplies for refugees from Iraq. It was here he encountered the International Solidarity Movement (ISM), and decided to make his way overland to Gaza. He arrived in the town of Rafah on 6 April 2003 and began emailing images of the Israel Defense Forces (IDF) and the Palestinians back to his family. His Guardian obituary states that "the tone of his journals changed dramatically". and he justified his new location with "No one could say I wasn't seeing what needs to be seen now".

Death
In April 2003, the IDF were on a mission in the Gaza border town of Rafah. Hurndall and a group of activists were in the area, having planned to set up a peace tent on one of the nearby roads to blockade IDF tank patrols. Hurndall was shot in the head on 11 April 2003. According to the IDF, an Israeli checkpoint came under fire from Palestinian militants, and the soldiers at the checkpoint returned fire. Hurndall's group of nine activists abandoned their protest to seek cover. Hurndall then ran out into the street and was shot in the head by an IDF soldier. He was taken to a Palestinian hospital in Rafah, and was declared clinically dead. The IDF transferred him to Israel, and he was taken to Soroka Medical Center in Beersheba, where he was kept on a ventilator and underwent surgery. Six weeks after the surgery, he was flown back to the United Kingdom, where he was taken to the Royal Hospital for Neuro-disability in London, where he remained in a persistent vegetative state, suffering from irreversible brain damage. He died on 13 January 2004, after nine months in a coma.

His father told a British inquest that, according to ISM and Palestinian witnesses, Hurndall had seen a group of children playing and had noticed that bullets were hitting the ground between them. Several children had run away but some were "paralysed with fear" and Hurndall went to help them. Hurndall's father told the inquest: "Tom went to take one girl out of the line of fire, which he did successfully, but when he went back, as he knelt down [to collect another], he was shot."

Israeli inquiry and trial
The IDF initially refused more than a routine internal inquiry, which concluded that Hurndall was shot accidentally in the crossfire, and suggested that his group's members were essentially functioning as human shields. However, witnesses at the demonstration in the Palestinian town of Rafah said he had been hit by a rifle bullet while trying to shield the children rather than having been merely hit in the crossfire, and Hurndall's parents demanded an investigation.

Investigation as a result of pressure
As pressure from the parents mounted, supported in part by British Foreign Secretary Jack Straw, in October 2003 Israel's Judge Advocate General Menachem Finkelstein ordered the IDF to open a further military police investigation into Hurndall's death.

Taysir Hayb's early testimony

Idier Wahid Taysir Hayb (or al-Heib), claimed, he had shot at a man in military fatigues although photographic evidence clearly showed Hurndall was wearing a bright orange jacket denoting he was a foreigner. Hayb was an award-winning marksman and his rifle had a telescopic sight. He claimed to have aimed four inches from Hurndall's head, "but he moved". Hayb said a policy of shooting at unarmed civilians existed at the time.

Autopsy report
The defence in the trial of Sergeant Hayb attempted to raise doubts as to what ultimately caused Hurndall's death. A military court was informed that Hurndall died of pneumonia. Chen Kugel, an Israeli forensic pathologist appearing for the defence, stated that the pneumonia had not been properly treated and "the large amounts of morphine" Hurndall was receiving contributed to his death. The court rejected these claims.

Hayb's change of testimony
On 1 January 2004, Sergeant Hayb, a 20-year-old IDF soldier, appeared in court to have his custody extended. Apparently he had been arrested in late December 2003 and an IDF press release said that he had "admitted to firing in proximity to an unarmed civilian as a deterrent". Initially the soldier admitted to shooting what he described as a man wearing a uniform of a Palestinian faction and armed with a pistol. Upon further interrogation, he changed his story, and said he had fired a shot near an unarmed civilian as a deterrent, but ended up hitting him unintentionally.

Indictments
After his changed testimony, the soldier was indicted on six charges, including a charge of aggravated assault. Following Hurndall's death, the military judge overseeing the case indicated the charge was likely to be changed to manslaughter or murder.

On 12 February 2004, the charge was upgraded to one of manslaughter. According to an army statement, he was also charged with "intent to cause injury, two counts of obstruction of justice, one count of submitting false information, one count of incitement to submit false information and one count of conduct unbecoming."

On 10 May 2004, Sergeant Hayb's trial began at a military court in Ashkelon. There were six indictments: manslaughter; two counts of obstruction of justice; incitement to false testimony; false testimony; improper conduct. Hayb had entered a plea of "Not Guilty" to all charges at an earlier non-public hearing. After some argument over the admissibility of Hayb's confession, the trial was adjourned until 19 May 2004. The trial remained adjourned for much of the time leading up to early August 2004.

Verdict
On 27 June 2005, Hayb was convicted of manslaughter, obstruction of justice, giving false testimony and inducing comrades in his unit to bear false witness; and, on 11 August 2005, he was sentenced to eleven and a half years for manslaughter by a military court, of which he was to serve eight years in prison. Hayb had, in August 2010 after an army committee headed by Advocate-General Avichai Mandelblit decided to do so, his sentence shortened for good behaviour, as a result of which he served a total of six and a half years in custody.

Military police report access denial
Tom Hurndall's family and their legal team were denied access to the military police report which led to the trial. After an appeal to the Israeli Supreme Court, in early August the state prosecution offered the legal team access to the report, but not to the Hurndall family themselves. According to a spokesman for the Tom Hurndall Foundation, this will allow them to decide whether Hayb could be indicted for the more serious charge of murder, and to find out if responsibility for Hurndall's death lies higher up the chain of command.

Coroner's inquest
On 10 April 2006, an English inquest jury at St Pancras coroner's court in London found that Hurndall had been "unlawfully killed". Hurndall's father told reporters that there had been a "general policy" to shoot civilians in the area without fear of reprisals, as stated by the soldier who fired the shot, Taysir Hayb. Hayb had earlier told a military tribunal that the Israeli army "fires freely in Rafah." The lawyer representing the family, Michael Mansfield QC, stated: 

Make no mistake about it, the Israeli defence force have today been found culpable by this jury of murder.

A week earlier, an inquest found that the British journalist James Miller had been killed by an Israeli soldier just three weeks after Mr. Hurndall was shot, a mile away from Hurndall's position. The coroner Dr. Andrew Reid stated that he would write to the Attorney General about how similar incidences could be prevented, including the possible prosecutions of Israeli commanders, and that the case raised issues of command within the IDF. He stated that "two British citizens engaged in lawful activities" had been killed by Israeli soldiers, and that "British citizens, journalists, photographers or others may be subject to the risk of fatal shots."

Media
Tom's mother Jocelyn Hurndall wrote a commentary in The Guardian on 10 January 2004, in which she stated:

It seems that life is cheap in the occupied territories. Different value attached to life depends on whether the victim happens to be Israeli, international or Palestinian.

Documentaries
On 13 October 2008, Channel 4 broadcast a dramatised documentary The Shooting of Thomas Hurndall, which was written by Simon Block and directed by Rowan Joffe. Stephen Dillane plays Anthony Hurndall and Kerry Fox plays Jocelyn Hurndall. Anthony and Jocelyn Hurndall were interviewed at length in The Observer prior to the airing of the documentary:

The Shooting of Thomas Hurndall was nominated for the 2009 British Academy Television Award for Best Single Drama (Simon Block, Rowan Joffe, Barney Reisz, Charles Furneaux) and won Best Actor (Stephen Dillane) and Best Director Fiction/Entertainment (Rowan Joffe). At the Monte Carlo TV Festival Rowan Joffe won Golden Nymph 2009 as Best Director in a TV Film.

Artistic tributes

Tom Hurndall memorialised in second movement (Dance for Tom Hurndall (no lyrics)) of US composer Philip Munger's 2003 cantata The Skies are Weeping which is titled after by Thushara Wijeratna's poem. The cantata which comprises seven movements for a soprano soloist, chamber choir, and percussion ensemble, is written in memory of Rachel Corrie, an American member of the International Solidarity Movement killed in 2003 by a bulldozer operated by the Israel Defense Forces while she tried to prevent a house demolition in the southern Gaza Strip during the Second Intifada.

See also
Iain Hook – British UNRWA worker fatally wounded by IDF sniper in the West Bank, 22 November 2002.
James Miller – British filmmaker fatally shot in Gaza by IDF sniper, 2 May 2003.
Rachel Corrie – American ISM volunteer killed by Israeli bulldozer in Gaza, 16 March 2003.
Brian Avery – American ISM volunteer shot and severely disfigured in Jenin, 5 April 2003.

Notes

References
Initial news stories on the shooting (April 2003), from Ha'aretz  and the BBC News Israeli troops 'wound Briton'	
A news story reporting the opening of the investigation (October 2003), from the BBC News Inquiry into activist shot in Israel	
News stories reporting the arrest of an IDF soldier (January 2004), from Ha'aretz  and the BBC News Israeli soldier held over shot Briton
News stories reporting Hurndall's death, from Ha'aretz  and the BBC News Shot British peace activist dies.	
A news story reporting a claim in the indictment that the soldier in question tried to cover up the shooting, from The Daily Telegraph Telegraph | News | Soldier 'tried to cover up killing of British activist'.	
 Parents fight to learn why Israeli sniper shot their son  – Published 30 January 2005  by The Observer.
 Times article reporting doubts on what ultimately caused Tom's death. The Times, 9 May 2005.
 Haaretz article about the conviction: 
 Archived news video footage of Tom Hurndall

External links

 Channel 4 Documentary
The Thomas Hurndall Fund	
Translation of Maariv article of 27 November 2003 (PDF)	
Eyewitness account of ISM member Joe Smith (contains explicit pictures)
Embassy of Israel in London Press Release
Video of IDF spokesperson claiming Tom was wearing fatigues and brandishing a pistol
Video taken moments after Tom was shot
Britons were intentionally killed by IDF, says inquest

Robert Fisk’s World: A brave man who stood alone. If only the world had listened to him The Independent
Eyewitness statements of fellow ISM volunteers Gush Shalom
Letter The Daily Telegraph
Israel official statement
Channel 4 interview

1981 births
2004 deaths
English social justice activists
Deaths by firearm in the Gaza Strip
Alumni of Manchester Metropolitan University
Second Intifada
Second Intifada casualties
British manslaughter victims
Human rights in the Gaza Strip
People educated at Winchester College
People killed by Israeli security forces